New York Presbyterian Church is a Korean Presbyterian megachurch, located in Long Island City, New York, in the borough of Queens.   

The church is a Korean presbyterian church founded in 1970. The church affiliated with the Korean American Presbyterian Church in 1974, become member of the New York City Presbytery. In 1999 the church constructed its present building, designed by Greg Lynn. In 2010 the church celebrated its 40th anniversary. In 2013 New York Presbyterian Church disaffiliated with the Korean American Presbyterian Church and in 2014 it affiliated with the PCA, which it has left soon after. In this year the church begun outreach ministries to English as well as Chinese people.

References

External links
Korean page
English page

Presbyterian churches in New York City
Presbyterian Church in America churches in New York (state)
Long Island City